The province of Rimini is a province in the Emilia-Romagna region of Italy. The provincial capital is the eponymous city of Rimini. The province borders the independent Republic of San Marino. The built-up urban area of
Rimini had a population of 147,578 inhabitants within city limits. There are 26 comuni (singular: comune) in the province.

History
Rimini was founded in 268 BCE as a Latin colony and was connected to both the Via Flaminia to Rome and the Via Emilia to Piacenza. It became an Augustan colony and after the 476 fall of Rome, it joined a Byzantine confederation containing a number of cities along the coast of Marche. Following this, it was under papal rule for many years until it became a commune in the eleventh century. It was ruled by the family of Guelph Malatesta until the sixteenth century, when it was briefly ruled by the Republic of Venice. It became part of the Papal States and later became a component of the kingdom of Italy. In World War II, it was heavily bombed but liberated in 1944 by British and Polish troops.

After the referendum of 2006, seven municipalities of Montefeltro were detached from the Province of Pesaro and Urbino (Marche) to join the Province of Rimini on 15 August 2009. The municipalities are Casteldelci, Maiolo, Novafeltria, Pennabilli, San Leo, Sant'Agata Feltria and Talamello. After the referendum of 2007, two other municipalities from the Province of Pesaro and Urbino, Montecopiolo and Sassofeltrio, joined the Province of Rimini on the 17th of June 2021.

Government

References

External links

 Official website 

 
Rimini